Abazgi is the branch of the Northwest Caucasian languages that contains the Abaza and Abkhaz languages. "Abazgi" was once the preferred designation, but has now been replaced by "Abkhaz–Abaza".

The literary dialects of Abkhaz and Abaza are two ends of a dialect continuum. Grammatically, the two are very similar; however, the differences in phonology are substantial, and are the main reason many linguists prefer to classify them as distinct languages. Most linguists (see for instance Viacheslav Chirikba 2003) believe that Ubykh is the closest relative of the Abazgi dialect continuum.

References

Bibliography
Wixman, Ronald.  The Peoples of the USSR. p. 2
Viacheslav Chirikba (2003) 'Abkhaz'. – Languages of the World/Materials 119. Muenchen: Lincom Europa.

Ethnic groups in Russia
Ethnic groups in Abkhazia
Northwest Caucasian languages